Fursovo is a rural locality (a village) in Lyakhovskoye Rural Settlement, Melenkovsky District, Vladimir Oblast, Russia. The population was 24 as of 2010. There are 2 streets.

Geography 
Fursovo is located on the Chernichka River, 18 km east of Melenki (the district's administrative centre) by road. Stepankovo is the nearest rural locality.

References 

Rural localities in Melenkovsky District